Nomura Babcock & Brown Co. Ltd. (NBB) is a Japanese investment firm and subsidiary of the Nomura Group. It was established in 1986 as a joint venture in 1986 between Nomura Securities Co., Ltd. (now known as Nomura Holdings, Inc.), Japan's largest security firm, and Babcock & Brown, an American investment and advisory firm. During the 1990s, the company became involved in a joint venture with The Walt Disney Company and Interscope Communications. It produced several films that were released between 1992 and 1995.

History
Nomura Babcock & Brown specializes in international leasing of aircraft, ships and other large equipment. It works in collaboration with BBAM Aircraft Management LLC (BBAM) to create investment programs tailored to Japanese investors. Nomura Babcock & Brown was established on March 3, 1986. as a joint venture between Nomura Securities Co., Ltd. (now known as Nomura Holdings), Japan's largest security firm, and Babcock & Brown, an American investment and advisory firm.

In 1990, Nomura Babcock & Brown invested $250 million in a joint venture with The Walt Disney Company and Interscope Communications. The deal called for NBB to co-produce and finance films for Interscope and Disney for four years. NBB produced five films between 1992 and 1995, all of which were marketed and released under two of Disney's production banners, Touchstone Pictures and Hollywood Pictures.

Filmography

References

External links
 

Investment companies of Japan
Film production companies of the United States
Nomura Holdings
Aircraft leasing companies
Financial services companies established in 1986
Financial services companies based in Tokyo
1986 establishments in Japan